The Yamai Devi Temple is situated in a hill complex in the town of Aundh, Satara district, Maharashtra, India.

History

It is said that Goddess Mahalaxmi, God Jyotiba of Kolhapur and Sri Rama (Lord Vishnu) called her as "Ye Mai" (in Marathi) (ये माय / ये माई) which means "Mother, pls. come" in English. Hence, she is known as Yamai Devi. Devotees are used to come with pure heart into one of the Devi Yamai's temples and to find her blessing.

Temple features
The Yamai temple is built on a small hill. The top of the hill can either be reached using steps that start at the bottom of the hill, or by car. There is a parking available at the top. The temple complex has the head of Rakshas Aundhasur, a well carved Nandi and a Shivling. The idol of the goddess, Yamai  in black stone is almost two metres high and is in a cross-legged sitting position. The temple is the family shrine (kula-daiwat) for a large number of Marathi families. The top of the temple has images and idols of various Hindu deities. The town and the temple has been associated with the PantPratinidhi family for many centuries. The present head of this former ruling family, Gayatreedevi Pantpratinidhi,  has installed a  solid gold kalash or crown on the pinnacle of the Yamai temple on the hill. Another temple of Devi Yamai is located in the town; apart from the one on the hill.
The temple had an elephant for religious processions and ceremonies for more than fifty years. It was taken to an elephant sanctuary in 2017 because of health issues.

Shri Bhavani Museum
The temple complex also houses the Shri Bhavani Museum established from the private collection of the Maharajas of Aundh. The museum building is situated on the middle section of the temple hill. Visitors can reach the museum, both by steps and road. The museum holds paintings by noted 19th and 20th century Indian artists such as M. V. Dhurandhar, Baburao Painter, Madhav Satwalekar and Raja Ravi Varma as well as the famous Mother and Child stone structure by  the British artist Henry Moore.

References

Hindu temples in Maharashtra
Tourist attractions in Satara district